Variimorda mendax is a species of tumbling flower beetles in the subfamily Mordellinaeof the family Mordellidae.

Subspecies
Variimorda mendax chobauti Méquignon, 1946
Variimorda mendax devillei Méquignon, 1946
Variimorda mendax mendax Méquignon, 1946

References

External links
 Biolib
 Fauna Europaea

Mordellidae
Beetles of Europe
Beetles described in 1946